Chris Jones (born July 21, 1989) is an American football punter who is a free agent. He played college football at Carson–Newman. He played for the Dallas Cowboys from 2011 to 2021.

Early years
Jones attended Coosa High School where he was an All-area punter as a senior. He is a left-footed kicker, and right-handed passer. He also practiced track and field.

He accepted a football scholarship from Carson-Newman College, where he was a four-time starter and All-SAC performer.

As a freshman in 2007, he led the SAC with a 41.4-yard average on 34 punts and landed 6 inside the 20-yard-line, with a long punt of 64 yards. As a sophomore, he averaged 38.5 yards on 41 punts and landed 6 punts inside the 20-yard-line, with a long punt of 57 yards.

As a junior, he appeared in all 14 games, ranking third in the conference in punting with 39.3 yards-per-punt average. He landed 8 punts inside the 20-yard line, forced 21 fair catches on 54 attempts and had a season-long punt of 55 yards against the University of North Carolina at Pembroke.

As a senior, he was second in the league with a 42.1-yard average, had a long punt of 73 yards (school record) against Winona State University, landed 15 punts inside the 20-yard-line and had nine punts of at least 50 yards. For his career he averaged 40.3 yards per punt, landed 46 punts inside the 20-yard-line and made 20 punts of at least 50 yards.

Professional career

2011 season
Jones was signed as an undrafted free agent by the Dallas Cowboys after the 2011 NFL Draft on July 28. He was released before the season started on September 3. He was signed to the team's practice squad on October 28. On November 5, he was promoted to the active roster, filling in for an injured Mat McBriar in one game against the Seattle Seahawks.

Jones was released on November 15 and signed to the practice squad on November 17. On December 31, he was promoted to the active roster. He punted in the season finale against the New York Giants in place of an injured McBriar, making 6 punts, a 42.3 gross average, a 38.8 net average, 2 punts downed inside the 20-yard line and a long of 54 yards.

2012 season
In 2012, the Cowboys decided not to re-sign McBriar and Jones entered the season as the starter at punter. He suffered a left knee injury on September 23, against the Tampa Bay Buccaneers, when he nearly had a punt blocked.

On October 14, a practice injury to punter Brian Moorman forced him to play against the Baltimore Ravens with a partially torn ACL he was still rehabbing. He was placed on the injured reserve list on October 24. He punted 12 times with a gross average of 45.2 yards, a net average of 40 yards and downed 6 punts inside the 20-yard-line.

2013 season
On August 24, 2013, during a preseason game against the Cincinnati Bengals, Jones became the second player (first Cowboys player) to hit the Cowboys Stadium high definition "jumbotron" scoreboard. He regained his starting job and in his first full season, finished with a 45-yard gross average, a 39.1-yard net average, 30 punts inside the 20-yard-line (third in team history) and a long of 62 yards.

2014 season
On March 10, 2014, Jones signed his exclusive rights tender of $645,000. He had a 45.4-yard per punt average with 21 downed inside the 20-yard line and a 39.8-yard net average and a long of 64 yards.

In the Wild Card Playoff Game against the Detroit Lions, he punted four times for a gross of 48.0 (second in team postseason history), a net of 47.5 (record in team postseason history) and three downed inside the 20. He contributed to the Cowboys limiting the Lions returners to just 10 yards - one punt for two and one kickoff for 8 yards.

2015 season
In 2015, Jones ranked third in the league with a career-best 42.5 net average, though the Cowboys required him to directional punt. He tied for fifth with 22 fair catches and tied for fourteenth with 27 punts inside the 20-yard-line.

On December 7 against the Washington Redskins, he became the first punter in franchise history to recover a fumble during the return of one of his own punts. He finished second in the NFC and third in the NFL with a career-best 42.5 punt net average, while downing 27 punts inside the 20-yard-line.

2016 season
In the seventh game against the Philadelphia Eagles, facing 4th-and-8 on the Cowboys 27-yard line, he had a 30-yard run on a fake punt that contributed to the eventual 29-23 overtime win and was the fourth-longest run by a punter in league history.

On December 26, 2016, in a Monday Night Football game against the Detroit Lions, Jones garnered attention from social media for a big hit on Lion's returner Andre Roberts during a fourth-quarter punt return. Roberts received the punt at the Lions 47 yard line. As Roberts broke the return down the left sideline, Cowboys linebacker Kyle Wilber had the angle on him. At the 30-yard line, Wilber dove toward Roberts where Jones met them both - lowering his shoulder and delivering a blow on Roberts that took the returner off his feet. In the season finale, he had a 66-yarder punt that bounced out of bounds at the Philadelphia Eagles' 1-yard line. 

Jones established a career-high with a 45.9-yard average, a career-long 66-yard punt, a 40.5-yard net average and 25 punts downed inside the 20-yard-line. He became the fifth punter in team history with at least 100 punts downed inside the 20-yard-line, landing 2 against the Baltimore Ravens. At the time, he had the all-time highest 
percentage of punts downed inside the 20-yard line (39.9%) in team history.

2017 season
On August 9, 2017, Jones signed a four-year contract extension with the Cowboys. In the fourteenth game against the Oakland Raiders, he called his own fake punt while facing 4th-and-11 on the Cowboys 10-yard line, rushing for 24 yards and a first down, that contributed to the eventual 20-17 win.

Jones had a career-best 34 punts downed inside the 20-yard line (second in team history), while registering a 41.4-yard net and a 44.1-yard gross average. He contributed to limit opponents to 75 punt return yards on the year - the fewest allowed in the league since the Atlanta Falcons yielded 49 yards in 2008 and the second-fewest in team history (41 yards in 1972).

2018 season
Jones averaged 44.5 yards-per-punt with 2 touchbacks. He downed 17 punts inside the 20-yard line and had a 39.6-yard net average. He became the third punter in club history with at least 150 career punts downed inside the 20-yard line. He played his 100th career game at Indianapolis on December 16.

2019 season

Jones suffered an important decline in productivity, averaging 41.6 gross yards and a 37-yard net average per attempt. Both stats were the NFL's lowest. At the end of the season, it was reported in the media that he played through a back and sports hernia injury.

2020 season
On November 7, 2020, Jones was placed on injured reserve after undergoing core muscle surgery. He was replaced with Hunter Niswander. He appeared in 8 games, averaging 42.6 yards on 24 punts, the second-lowest season average in his career. He also had 2 kickoffs. He was released after the season on March 17, 2021.

References

External links
 Punter Jones Right At Home Being Under the Radar
 Carson-Newman Eagles bio

1989 births
Living people
American football punters
Carson–Newman Eagles football players
Dallas Cowboys players
Players of American football from Georgia (U.S. state)
Sportspeople from Rome, Georgia